Robert Emmet Savage (16 March 1895 – 2 July 1959) was an Australian politician.

He was born at Enmore to ex-Irish seaman William Savage and Mary McCarthy. He attended Christian Brothers' College in Balmain and became a clerk with the Metropolitan Board of Water Supply. He was also an organiser with the Sewerage Employees' Association, serving as assistant secretary from 1929 to 1943 and as secretary from 1955 to 1959. On 22 April 1935 he married Philomena Meany, with whom he had two daughters. He was a Labor member of the New South Wales Legislative Council from 1931 to 1934 and from 1943 to 1959, when he died at Lane Cove.

References

1895 births
1959 deaths
Australian Labor Party members of the Parliament of New South Wales
Members of the New South Wales Legislative Council
20th-century Australian politicians